"Loaded" is a single by Ricky Martin, released on April 17, 2001 from his album Sound Loaded. The Spanish-language version is called "Dame Más" (English: "Gimme More").

Music video
The music video, directed by Bob Giraldi, aired in June 2001.

Chart performance
"Loaded" peaked inside top twenty in Sweden (number fourteen), Spain (number eighteen), and the United Kingdom (number nineteen). On the Billboard Hot 100, the single reached number ninety-seven.

Awards
"Loaded" was nominated for the Latin Dance Maxi-single of the Year at the 2002 Latin Billboard Music Awards.

Live performances
Martin delivered a performance of "Loaded" on the BBC's Top of the Pops on July 27, 2001.

Formats and track listings

Australian CD maxi-single  
"Loaded" – 3:52
"Loaded" (Fused - Re-Loaded Mix 03) – 3:41 
"Loaded" (Monetshot - Edit) – 4:06 
"Loaded" (Can 7 - Radio Flag Mix) – 4:35
"Loaded" (Robbie Rivera - Vocal Mix) – 6:53
"Nobody Wants to Be Lonely" (Jazzy Remix Radio Edit) – 3:55

European CD single
"Loaded" (George Noriega Radio Edit) – 3:14   
"Loaded" (Robbie Rivera - Diskofied Vocal Mix) – 6:51

European CD maxi-single #1
"Loaded" (George Noriega Radio Edit) – 3:14  
"Loaded" (Robbie Rivera - Diskofied Vocal Mix) – 6:51
"Loaded" (Can 7 - Dame Más Fairground Mix) – 4:00
"Loaded" (Video)

European CD maxi-single #2
"Loaded" (Can 7 - Dame Más Fairground Mix) – 4:00 
"Loaded" (Monetshot - Edit) – 4:06 
"Loaded" (Robbie Rivera - Diskofied Vocal Mix) – 6:51
"Loaded" (Fused - Re-Loaded Mix 3) – 3:41
"Loaded" (Can 7 - Club Flag Mix) – 8:45

Japanese CD maxi-single  
"Loaded" – 3:52 
"Nobody Wants to Be Lonely" (with Christina Aguilera) – 4:11 
"Sólo Quiero Amarte" (Radio Edit) – 3:59

Spanish prmotional CD single
"Dame Más" – 3:52 

UK CD maxi-single
"Loaded" – 3:52 
"Loaded" (Robbie Rivera - Diskofied Vocal Mix) – 6:51
"Loaded" (Can 7 - Dame Más Fairground Mix) – 4:00  
"Loaded" (Video)

UK promotional CD single
"Loaded" (Monetshot Mix) – 6:35
"Loaded" (Almighty Mix) – 7:56
"Loaded" (Robbie Rivera - Diskofied Vocal Mix) – 6:51
"Loaded" (Fused - Re-Loaded Mix #3) – 3:45
"Loaded" (Can 7 - Radio Flag Mix) – 4:35
"Loaded" (Can 7 - Taste The Music Mix) – 8:30

UK promotional 12" single
"Loaded" (Robbie Rivera - Diskofied Vocal Mix) – 6:51
"Loaded" (Fused - Re-Loaded Mix 1) – 8:20
"Loaded" (Can 7 - Taste The Music Mix) – 8:30
"Loaded" (Can 7 - Dame Más Fairground Mix) – 4:00 
 
US CD maxi-single
"Loaded" (George Noriega Radio Edit 1) – 3:14  
"Loaded" (Almighty Mix) – 7:56
"Loaded" (Almighty Dub Mix) – 7:59 
"Loaded" (Robbie Rivera - Diskofied Vocal Mix) – 6:51
"Loaded" (Fused Re-Loaded Mix) – 8:20

US prmotional CD single
"Loaded" (George Noriega Radio Edit 1) – 3:14
"Loaded" (George Noriega Radio Edit 2) – 3:49
"Loaded" (Album Version) – 3:52

Charts

Weekly charts

Year-end charts

Release history

References

2000 songs
2001 singles
Ricky Martin songs
Columbia Records singles
Song recordings produced by Emilio Estefan
Songs written by George Noriega
Songs written by Draco Rosa
Songs written by Jon Secada